Vernon Hill is an unincorporated community in Halifax County, Virginia, United States. Vernon Hill has a post office with ZIP code 24597, which opened on September 8, 1856.

Woodlawn was listed on the National Register of Historic Places in 2005.

References

Unincorporated communities in Halifax County, Virginia
Unincorporated communities in Virginia